Beit Amin is a Palestinian village in the Qalqilya Governorate in the western West Bank, located south of Qalqilya. According to the Palestinian Central Bureau of Statistics, the village had a population of approximately 1,147 inhabitants in 2006.

Location
Beit Amin is located 8.35km south-east of Qalqiliya. It is bordered by Sanniriya to the east, Al Mudawwar and ‘Izbat al Ashqar to the south, ‘Izbat Salman to the west, and ‘Azzun ‘Atma to the north.

History
In 1882 the PEF's Survey of Western Palestine noted Khurbet Beit Yemin (under "Archæology"): "Walls, cisterns and rock-cut tomb."

British Mandate 
The village passed to British control they defeated the Ottoman Empire in World War 1. The village was administered under the British Mandate for Palestine until 1948.

Jordanian Era 
In the wake of the 1948 Arab–Israeli War, and after the 1949 Armistice Agreements, Beit Amin came under Jordanian rule.

Post-1967
Since the Six-Day War in 1967, Beit Amin has been under Israeli occupation.  

After the 1995 accords, about 29.2% of village land was classified as Area B, the remainding 70.8% as Area C. Israel has confiscated land from Beit Amin, ‘Azzun ‘Atma and Mas-ha in order to construct the Israeli settlement of Shi'ar Tikvah. In addition, the Israeli West Bank barrier will isolate some of Beit Amins village land behind the wall.

References

Bibliography

External links
Welcome to Beit Amin
Survey of Western Palestine, Map 14:  IAA,  Wikimedia commons
Beit Amin village (fact sheet), Applied Research Institute–Jerusalem, ARIJ
Beit Amin village profile, ARIJ
Beit Amin, aerial photo, ARIJ
Development Priorities and Needs in Beit Amin, ARIJ
Subterranean Wells of Jayyus and Beit Amin villages in Qalqiliya governorate-swamped with waste dumped by Israeli settlers 12, February, 2007, ARIJ

Qalqilya Governorate
Villages in the West Bank
Municipalities of the State of Palestine